Datla is a Telugu surname. Notable people bearing the name Datla include:
 
 Colonel D. S. Raju (Datla Satyanarayana Raju)–Personal doctor to Netaji Subhash Chandra Bose
 D. V. S. Raju (Datla Venkata Suryanarayana Raju) –film producer & chairman National Film Development Corporation.
 D B Venkatesh Varma  (Datla Bala Venkatesh Varma) - Indian Ambassador to Russia
 Ramesh Datla - Chairman and Managing Director of Elico Limited, and Chairman, CII Southern Region. Also the Vice-Chairman of All India Kshatriya Federation
 Datla Venkata Krishnam Raju - Founder of Biological E. Limited.
 Mahima Datla - Mahima Datla is the Managing Director of Biological E. Limited.
 Datla Rama Chandra Raju - Founder of iMedServe Solutions.